Crooked Tree is an unincorporated community in Jackson Township, Noble County, Ohio, United States.

History
Crooked Tree was originally called Jacksonville, and under the latter name was laid out in 1854. The present name was given on account of there being a crooked tree near the original town site. A post office was established under the name Crooked Tree in 1858, and remained in operation until 1904.

References

Unincorporated communities in Noble County, Ohio
Unincorporated communities in Ohio